Weatherford High School may refer to:

Weatherford High School (Oklahoma) - Weatherford, Oklahoma
Weatherford High School (Texas) - Weatherford, Texas